The Buenos Aires Herald was an English language daily newspaper published in Buenos Aires, Argentina from 1876 to 2017. Its slogan was A World of Information in a few words.

History
Under the original name of The Buenos Ayres Herald, it was founded on 15 September 1876 by Scottish immigrant William Cathcart. At first it consisted of a single sheet with advertising on the front and mostly shipping coverage on the back. When Cathcart sold the paper a year later, it changed from a weekly to a daily format, focusing on more typical newspaper content, but always with a large shipping section. It quickly became the main source of local information for the English-speaking population of Buenos Aires.

In 1925 the Rugeroni brothers, Junius Julius and Claude Ronald, bought the paper.

The Evening Post Publishing Company from Charleston, South Carolina, United States, purchased a controlling interest in Junius Rugeroni's holdings in 1968.

During the military dictatorship in Argentina (1976–1983) The Buenos Aires Herald, under the direction of the British journalist Robert Cox, was the only local media that told the story of the forced disappearances of people from the opposition to the regime. Due to this, Cox was detained for a while and his family received threats, and an attempt was made to kidnap his wife. This forced him to leave the country with his family in 1979. Following these departures, the threats continued against Cox's replacement, James Neilson and against Dan Newland as the newspaper's main editorial writers.

Author and journalist Uki Goñi worked for the Herald in 1975–83, first as a collaborator and from April 1977 until January 1983 as a full-time journalist and national news editor, publishing reports of the "disappearances" carried out by the dictatorship as they happened. Goñi later went on to write Op-Eds for The New York Times, write on a regular basis for The Guardian and the New York Review of Books. His 1996 book "El Infiltrado" about the crimes of the dictatorship and the Buenos Aires Herald would help condemn Navy officers in the 2011 ESMA trial and Goñi himself would be a witness in this trial.

In 2017, Amazon Prime premiered a documentary titled Messenger on a White Horse about the brave role played by editor Robert Cox standing up to the dictatorship.
 
The newspaper's opposition against the military regime between 1976 and 1983 led to constant threats. Shortly after the coup, in 1976, staff writer Andrew Graham-Yooll was forced into exile. At the time, Graham-Yooll was also writing for The Daily Telegraph of Britain. He returned to The Buenos Aires Herald as editor-in-chief in 1994.

Columnist Eric Ehrmann wrote for the paper during the transition from dictatorship to democracy (1985–1990) under the editorships of Dan Newland, James Neilson and others. His articles discussed the proliferation risks associated with the controversial Condor (Tammuz) medium range guided missile system being built by Argentina and Iraqi Ba'ath Party strongman Saddam Hussein along with European companies, and controversial dual-use issues that caused Argentina to ratify the Nuclear Nonproliferation Treaty. Ehrmann was simultaneously writing columns about Southern Cone politics for the American periodicals The Christian Science Monitor and National Review.

In 1998, the Evening Post Publishing Company became the sole owner of the newspaper. On 15 December 2007 the Argentine businessman Sergio Szpolski bought the newspaper and added it to his multimedia holdings. Almost a year later, Szpolski sold it to Amfin, which publishes the financial newspaper Ámbito Financiero. In February 2015 Grupo Indalo became the majority owner.

In January 2015, Damián Pachter, a journalist for the Heralds online version, broke the news of prosecutor Alberto Nisman's death to the country on Twitter. Nisman died in mysterious circumstances the day before he was set to give details at Congress regarding his legal charges against President Cristina Fernández de Kirchner for allegedly covering up the investigation into the 1994 AMIA Jewish community centre bombings. Pachter's source remains unknown, and the journalist fled Argentina for Israel subsequently, saying he feared for his life. Journalists at the paper's editorial office later said that Patcher never told them that he had been threatened, and that he said that he was leaving the newspaper because of health problems.

On Friday 28 July 2017 the last edition of the only English-language daily newspaper in Latin America was published. The paper had moved to weekly publication after the last daily edition on 26 October 2016, shedding most of its staff after "facing difficulties for a while now", but with the drop in circulation it was not able to survive financially.

Format 
The Buenos Aires Herald had a Berliner format, with supplements:
 OnSunday: (Sundays): A Sunday supplement with a view to the events of the past week. Includes an analysis of the events of the week and commentary from the Buenos Aires Heralds staff.
 World Trade: (Mondays): Covers foreign commerce news and maritime issues related to commerce.

Successor
An English-language newspaper, Buenos Aires Times, was later published by Editorial Perfil S.A., online and printed with Perfil newspaper on Saturdays; Andrew Graham-Yooll, formerly the chief editor of the Buenos Aires Herald, became Perfil's ombudsman.

See also
English Argentines

References 

Daily newspapers published in Argentina
English-language newspapers published in South America
Publications established in 1876
Publications disestablished in 2017
Mass media in Buenos Aires
1876 establishments in Argentina